Sadoul is a French surname. Notable people with the surname include:

 Georges Sadoul (1904–1967), French journalist and cinema writer
 Numa Sadoul (born 1947), French writer, actor, and director
 Jacques Sadoul (1934–2013), French author
 Jacques Sadoul (politician) (1881–1956), French communist politician

French-language surnames